The San Francisco Bay Area Film Critics Circle Award for Best Supporting Actor is an award given by the San Francisco Bay Area Film Critics Circle to honor an actor who has delivered an outstanding performance in a supporting role.

Winners

2000s

2010s

San Francisco Film Critics Circle Awards
Film awards for supporting actor